Gideon Omokirio (born 12 October 1976 in Honiara) is a Solomon Islands footballer who is the current Coach of  Isabel Frigates  in the current ongoing Solomon Cup 2020.

His brother Eddie was also active in football.

Club career
Giggs Omokirio had played most of his club football in his home country, only for a short spell in New Zealand. He then joined Papua New Guinea side Hekari in 2009.

In May 2010, he won the Oceania Champions League with Hekari United.

International career
Omokirio made his debut for the Solomon Islands in a May 1996 OFC Nations Cup match against Tahiti and has represented his country in every age group at international level including representing his country at the 2006, 2007 and 2008 Beach Soccer World Cups. He has skippered the national team on several occasions.

He played in 17 World Cup qualification games from 1996 through 2007.

Honours
Oceania Champions League: 1
 2010

Other sports
Omokirio was the national champion in the 200 metres running and the long jump.

Achievements in other sports

References

1976 births
Living people
Solomon Islands footballers
Solomon Islands international footballers
Solomon Islands male sprinters
Solomon Islands long jumpers
Association football defenders
Nelson Suburbs players
Hekari United players
1996 OFC Nations Cup players
2000 OFC Nations Cup players
2002 OFC Nations Cup players
2004 OFC Nations Cup players
Solomon Islands expatriate footballers
Expatriate association footballers in New Zealand
Expatriate footballers in Papua New Guinea
Solomon Islands expatriate sportspeople in New Zealand
Solomon Islands expatriate sportspeople in Papua New Guinea